The Hunger Games film series consists of four science-fiction adventure films based on The Hunger Games novels by the American author Suzanne Collins. The four films, entitled The Hunger Games, The Hunger Games: Catching Fire, The Hunger Games: Mockingjay – Part 1 and The Hunger Games: Mockingjay – Part 2, were released serially worldwide between March 2012 and 2015. The first one was directed by Gary Ross, while the other three were directed by Francis Lawrence. Distributed by Lionsgate and produced by Nina Jacobson, it stars Jennifer Lawrence, Josh Hutcherson and Liam Hemsworth as the three leading characters, Katniss Everdeen, Peeta Mellark and Gale Hawthorne, respectively.

Every film was a financial success and achieved blockbuster status. The Hunger Games grossed over $694 million worldwide against its budget of $78 million, making it the third-highest-grossing film in the United States, only behind The Avengers and The Dark Knight Rises, and ninth-highest-grossing worldwide of 2012. The Hunger Games: Catching Fire topped the highest-grossing film at the domestic box office of 2013. It also grossed over $865 million worldwide and is currently the highest-grossing entry in The Hunger Games series. The Hunger Games: Mockingjay – Part 1 ranked second at the domestic office of 2014, grossing $337 million, while over $755 million worldwide. Part 2 has grossed $281 million in North America, with a total of $652 million worldwide.

Overall, the film series received positive reception from critics. The Hunger Games scored an 84% rating based on a sample of 277 reviews on review aggregator Rotten Tomatoes with an average of 7.2/10. The second entry performed even better with critics, garnering an approval rating of 89%, with an average of 7.5/10. The Hunger Games: Mockingjay – Part 1 scored a 69% rating based on 293 reviews, while Part 2 had a 70% rating, with average of 6.5/10, based on 231 reviews.

The Hunger Games film series received awards and nominations in a variety of categories with particular praise for its direction, screenplay and the performances of Jennifer Lawrence. As of February 2016, it has received a total of 55 awards from 140 nominations. The series won nine MTV Movie Awards out of twenty-six nominations, seven People's Choice Awards out of eight nominations and received three Grammy Awards and Golden Globe Awards nominations, winning a Grammy Award for Best Song Written for Visual Media for "Safe & Sound".

The Hunger Games

The first film in the franchise, The Hunger Games was released in theatres in the US on March 23, 2012. The story takes place in a dystopian post-apocalyptic future in the nation of Panem, where boys and girls between the ages of 12 and 18 must take part in the Hunger Games, a televised annual event in which the "tributes" are required to fight to the death until there is one remaining who will be crowned the victor. Katniss Everdeen (Jennifer Lawrence) volunteers to take her younger sister's place in the games. Joined by her district's male tribute Peeta Mellark (Josh Hutcherson), Katniss travels to the Capitol to train for the Hunger Games under the guidance of former victor Haymitch Abernathy (Woody Harrelson).

The Hunger Games received fifty-one nominations, and won twenty-eighth. The song "Safe & Sound" won a Grammy Award and was nominated for a Golden Globe Award for Best Original Song. For her performance, Lawrence won the Saturn Award and the Empire Award for Best Actress, and the Critics' Choice Awards for Best Actress in an Action Movie. Meanwhile, Hutcherson won a MTV Movie Award for Best Male Performance, a Teen Choice Award for Choice Movie Actor – Sci-Fi/Fantasy and a Do Something! Awards for Best Male Movie Star, and Elizabeth Banks won the MTV Movie Award for Best On-Screen Transformation.

The Hunger Games: Catching Fire

The Hunger Games: Catching Fire was released on November 22, 2013 in the United States. The plot takes place a few months after the previous installment; Katniss Everdeen has now returned home safely after winning the 74th Annual Hunger Games along with fellow tribute Peeta Mellark. Throughout the story, Katniss senses that a rebellion against the oppressive Capitol is simmering through the districts.

Catching Fire also received a total of fifty nominations, winning sixteen times. The film was nominated for the Critics' Choice Awards for Best Action Film and a Saturn Award for Best Science Fiction Film. It won the MTV Movie Award for Best Movie and the Empire Award for Best Film and Best Thriller. For her performance, Lawrence was nominated a second time for the Empire Award for Best Actress as well as the Saturn Award and Critics' Choice Award. The song "Atlas" was also nominated for the Grammy Award for Best Song Written for Visual Media and a Golden Globe Award for Best Original Song, and won a Hollywood Film Award for Best Song.

The Hunger Games: Mockingjay – Part 1

The Hunger Games: Mockingjay – Part 1 is the first part of a two-part sequel, released on November 21, 2014 in the United States. The story continues to follow Katniss Everdeen; having twice survived the Hunger Games, Katniss finds herself in District 13. Under the leadership of President Coin (Julianne Moore) and the advice of her trusted friends, Katniss reluctantly becomes the symbol of a mass rebellion against the Capitol and fights to save Peeta and a nation moved by her courage.

Part 1 received twenty-seven nominations, with ten wins. It is the lowest-rated Hunger Games film of the franchise according to review aggregator Rotten Tomatoes. The film garnered a nomination for Best Science Fiction Film at the 41st Saturn Awards and its third consecutive nomination for the MTV Movie Awards for Best Movie. For her performance, Lawrence received a nomination for Best Actress in an Action Movie at the 20th Critics' Choice Awards and a Saturn Award nomination. The song "Yellow Flicker Beat" also received a nomination for Best Original Song at the 72nd Golden Globe Awards and Critics' Choice Awards. Meanwhile, Banks won for the second a MTV Movie Award for Best On-Screen Transformation.

The Hunger Games: Mockingjay – Part 2

The Hunger Games: Mockingjay – Part 2 is the fourth and final installment in The Hunger Games film series, and the second of two films, released on November 20, 2015, in the United States. The story continues with Katniss Everdeen, as she prepares to win the war against President Snow (Donald Sutherland) and the tyrannical Capitol. Together with Peeta, Gale, Finnick (Sam Claflin), and others, she travels to the Capitol to kill Snow. However, President Coin, the leader of District 13 and the rebellion, hides a bigger agenda that could not only jeopardize Katniss' life, but the future of Panem.

Part 2 has received 17 nominations, winning five, winning three 2nd place prizes and one 3rd place prize.

See also
 2012 in film
 2013 in film
 2014 in film
 2015 in film

Notes

References

External links 

 
 
 
 

Lists of accolades by film series
The Hunger Games (film series)